Catherine Fournier (born 7 April 1992) is a Canadian politician, who was elected as mayor of Longueuil on November 7, 2021. She is the third female mayor in the city's history.

She was previously member of the National Assembly of Quebec, having been elected in a by-election on December 5, 2016. She represented the electoral district of Marie-Victorin. Fournier was the youngest member of the National Assembly, and the youngest woman ever elected to that body.

Originally elected as a member of the Parti Québécois, Fournier won a full term in 2018 even amid the PQ's meltdown in Greater Montreal; she was the only surviving PQ member from the metro area. However, she quit the PQ on March 11, 2019 to sit as an independent MNA. She believed the party had lost its way ideologically, though she still considers herself a committed sovereigntist.

Before her election to the National Assembly, Fournier ran for the Bloc Québécois in the 2015 federal election in the riding of Montarville, finishing second. She also briefly served as the party's vice-president.

Early life
Fournier was born in Sainte-Julie, Quebec on 7 April 1992. She holds an economics major and political science minor from the Université de Montréal. She was a political blogger and columnist for 103.3 FM.

Electoral record

Federal
Montarville

Provincial

Marie-Victorin

References 

1992 births
Living people
Mayors of Longueuil
Parti Québécois MNAs
People from Sainte-Julie, Quebec
Women MNAs in Quebec
Bloc Québécois candidates for the Canadian House of Commons
Candidates in the 2015 Canadian federal election
Independent MNAs in Quebec
Women mayors of places in Quebec
21st-century Canadian women politicians